Ladevèze-Ville is a commune in the Gers department in southwestern France.

Geography

The commune is bordered by five other communes, four of them is in Gers, and one in Hautes-Pyrénées: Tieste-Uragnoux to the northwest, Saint-Aunix-Lengros to the north, Ladevèze-Rivière to the northeast, Armentieux to the southeast, and finally by the department of Hautes-Pyrénées to the southwest by the commune of Labatut-Rivière to the southwest.

Population

See also
Communes of the Gers department

References

Communes of Gers